Lakewood Park is a census-designated place in Coffee County, Tennessee, United States. The  population was 1,161 at the 2020 census, up from 990 at the 2010 census. It is located near Tennessee State Route 280, north of Manchester.

Demographics

Recreation
Lakewood Lake

References

External links
Lakewood Park former website
 New Lakewood Park website

Census-designated places in Coffee County, Tennessee
Census-designated places in Tennessee